Thomas McEllistrim (15 January 1926 – 25 February 2000) was an Irish Fianna Fáil politician who served as a Minister of State from 1979 to 1981 and from March 1982 to December 1982. He served as a Teachta Dála (TD) for the Kerry North constituency from 1969 to 1987 and 1989 to 1992 and a Senator from 1987 to 1989, upon being Nominated by the Taoiseach.

Born in Boherbue, County Cork in 1926, McEllistrim was the son of the Fianna Fáil politician and War of Independence veteran, Tom McEllistrim. McEllistrim the younger succeeded his father when he was elected to Dáil Éireann as a Fianna Fáil TD for the Kerry North constituency at the 1969 general election. At the 1977 general election, McEllistrim was elected along with his running mate Kit Ahern. This was the first time that Fianna Fáil had won two seats in the three-seat Kerry North constituency. McEllistrim, who was given much credit for this victory, was disappointed not to receive a promotion as a Minister of State.

McEllistrim became disillusioned with the Taoiseach and party leader Jack Lynch from then and began to believe that Charles Haughey was the right candidate for the party leadership. McEllistrim believed that Lynch was about to retire and was uncomfortable at the thought of George Colley succeeding Lynch. Like his father before him, he believed Colley was not right for the role of leader of the party and not republican enough. McEllistrim was particularly vocal with regard to party policy towards Northern Ireland and, as he saw it, Lynch's apparent lack of sympathy towards the northern nationalist community.

McEllistrim was a member of the so-called "gang of five" along with Seán Doherty, Mark Killilea Jnr, Jackie Fahey and Albert Reynolds who started a lobbying campaign in favour of Haughey on the backbenches of the party. After Lynch lost two by-elections in his native Cork he resigned as party leader in December 1979. Two days later, the leadership contest was called. It was a two-way race between Haughey and Colley, which Haughey won by a decisive margin. Ellistrim was rewarded by being appointed Minister of State at the Department of Finance with special responsibility for the Office of Public Works. Fianna Fáil went into opposition after the 1981 general election, but returned to office after the February 1982 general election. McEllistrim was appointed as Minister of State at the Department of Fisheries and Forestry with responsibility for Forestry, serving from March to December 1982.

McEllistrim lost his seat at the 1987 general election by four votes to Dick Spring. After being nominated to Seanad Éireann as a Senator, he regained his seat at the 1989 general election but did not retain it at the 1992 general election when he lost to constituency colleague Denis Foley.

McEllistrim died aged 74 on 25 February 2000. His son, Tom McEllistrim, was a TD for Kerry North from 2002 to 2011.

See also
Families in the Oireachtas

References

1926 births
2000 deaths
Fianna Fáil TDs
Members of the 19th Dáil
Members of the 20th Dáil
Members of the 21st Dáil
Members of the 22nd Dáil
Members of the 23rd Dáil
Members of the 24th Dáil
Members of the 18th Seanad
Members of the 26th Dáil
Local councillors in County Kerry
Politicians from County Kerry
Ministers of State of the 23rd Dáil
Ministers of State of the 21st Dáil
Nominated members of Seanad Éireann
Fianna Fáil senators